The Basketball tournament at the 2014 Lusophony Games was held in Goa, India from 23 to 27 January 2014. The winners were India (Men's tournament) and Mozambique (women's tournament).

Basketball at the 2014 Lusophony Games

Competition format 
A round-robin tournament was played.

Calendar

Men's competition

Women's competition

Medal summary

Medal table

Events

Final standings

External links 
 Official website

References 

 
Basketball at the Lusofonia Games
Basketball
2014 in basketball
International basketball competitions hosted by India